James Edward Charles Franklin (born 7 November 1980) is a New Zealand cricket coach and former cricketer, who played all forms of the game internationally.

Franklin played as a left-arm medium-fast bowler who swung the ball, and a middle order batsman who hit the ball with power. He began his career as a capable left-handed lower order batsman, but greatly improved his batting during his career. He is one of only two New Zealanders to take a hat-trick in Test cricket, a feat he achieved in October 2004 against Bangladesh.

Playing career
Domestically Franklin played for Wellington. He made his international debut in a One Day International (ODI) against Pakistan in early 2001 aged 20 as a result of a series of injuries to New Zealand's bowlers. He made his Test debut in Auckland against Pakistan later in the year, collecting a pair and taking two wickets. In April 2006, he scored his maiden Test century, making 122 not out in the second Test against South Africa in Cape Town.

In the 2007 Cricket World Cup, Franklin became the first man to take a wicket with their first ball on World Cup debut. He scored two first-class double centuries, both for Wellington against Auckland, making 208 in 2005/06 and 219 in 2008/09.

Franklin played county cricket for Essex, Glamorgan, Gloucestershire, Nottinghamshire and Middlesex. On 6 February 2015, it was announced that James Franklin had signed for Middlesex, initially on a two-year contract, effectively retiring from international cricket. Due to a Northern Irish grandfather from Enniskillen, he was able to play as a domestic player, playing for the side until the end of the 2018 season.

He played in the Indian Premier League for Mumbai Indians, in the Bangladesh Premier League for Rajshahi Kings, in the Australian Big Bash League for Adelaide Strikers and in the Caribbean Premier League for Guyana Amazon Warriors and Barbados Tridents.

Coaching career
In January 2019 Franklin was appointed the head coach of Durham County Cricket Club. After four seasons, in which their high point was reaching the final of the 2021 Royal London One-Day Cup, he stepped down in September 2022. He is currently serving as the bowling coach of Islamabad United in the ongoing PSL 8.

Personal life
He is married and has a son born in November 2008.

See also
 List of Test cricket hat-tricks

References

External links
 
 
 

1980 births
Living people
New Zealand people of Northern Ireland descent
Adelaide Strikers cricketers
Barbados Royals cricketers
Essex cricketers
Glamorgan cricketers
Gloucestershire cricketers
Guyana Amazon Warriors cricketers
Middlesex cricket captains
Middlesex cricketers
Mumbai Indians cricketers
New Zealand Test cricketers
New Zealand One Day International cricketers
New Zealand Twenty20 International cricketers
New Zealand Youth One Day International captains
New Zealand cricketers
New Zealand expatriate sportspeople in England
New Zealand expatriate sportspeople in Australia
Nottinghamshire cricketers
Rajshahi Royals cricketers
Wellington cricketers
Test cricket hat-trick takers
Cricketers at the 2007 Cricket World Cup
Cricketers at the 2011 Cricket World Cup
New Zealand cricket coaches
North Island cricketers